Maarten Lafeber (born 11 December 1974) is a Dutch professional golfer who won the Dutch, Swiss and Spanish amateur championships before turning professional in 1997.

Lafeber was born in Eindhoven, North Brabant. He earned a European Tour card at the first attempt, but lost it at the end of 1998. After spending time on the second tier Challenge Tour, where he won the 1999 Tusker Kenya Open, he regained his place on the main tour for the 2000 season. In 2003 he became the first home player to win the Dutch Open since Joop Rühl 1947, and that remains his only win on the European Tour. In July 2005 he reached a career high ranking of 88 in the World Golf Ranking.

Lafeber sold shares in himself to finance his career, and bought the shareholders out at a profit of 85% at the end of the 2004 season.

Amateur wins
1995 Dutch Amateur Stroke Play Championship
1997 Dutch Amateur Championship, Spanish Amateur Open Championship, Swiss Amateur Open Championship

Professional wins (2)

European Tour wins (1)

Challenge Tour wins (1)

Results in major championships

Note: Lafeber never played in the Masters Tournament.

CUT = missed the half-way cut
"T" = tied

Team appearances
Amateur
European Amateur Team Championship (representing the Netherlands): 1993, 1995, 1997
European Youths' Team Championship (representing the Netherlands): 1994
Eisenhower Trophy (representing the Netherlands): 1994, 1996
St Andrews Trophy (representing the Continent of Europe): 1996

Professional
World Cup (representing the Netherlands): 1999, 2001, 2004, 2005, 2007
Seve Trophy (representing Continental Europe): 2005

See also
2011 European Tour Qualifying School graduates

References

External links

Dutch male golfers
European Tour golfers
Sportspeople from Eindhoven
1974 births
Living people
21st-century Dutch people